William Walmsley (1859 – 16 July 1938) was a New Zealand cricketer. He played in one first-class matches for Canterbury in 1889/90.

See also
 List of Canterbury representative cricketers

References

External links
 

1859 births
1938 deaths
Canterbury cricketers
Cricketers from Blackburn
New Zealand cricketers